Constantin Niculae (born 1 April 1955) is a Romanian judoka. He competed at the 1980 Summer Olympics and the 1984 Summer Olympics.

References

External links
 

1955 births
Living people
Romanian male judoka
Olympic judoka of Romania
Judoka at the 1980 Summer Olympics
Judoka at the 1984 Summer Olympics
People from Dâmbovița County